Roy Debran is an American former Negro league outfielder who played in the 1940s.

Debran played for the New York Black Yankees in 1943. In three recorded games, he posted three hits in 12 plate appearances.

References

External links
 and Seamheads

Year of birth missing
Place of birth missing
New York Black Yankees players